Babban Zaki also known as Jan Rano was a Sultan of Kano who reigned from 1768-1776. One of the most significant rulers of the House of Kutumbi, he solved the puzzle of Kano's complex structure and provided the blueprint for its successful administration which would survive even after the fall of the Kutumbawa. Through the utilization of force and espionage, he created order out of chaos by pitting government officials against each other and disrupting communication channels between chiefs in the State to avoid organized revolts. He was also the first King to arm the Kano royal guard with muskets.

Reign 
"He was an able Sarki, of great strength, renowned for his memory and eloquence,  He was called Babban Zaki.... Hence he was called Jan Rano, well named the disturber of elephants"

He was the Eldest son of Yaji II's three infamous sons. His mother's name was yerduna. The Kano chronicle omits his birth name, his ephitet Babban Zaki, means "Great Lion". He was also praised as "Jan Rano, Gasa Giwa", which translates to "The three pronged fork who roasts elephants" in attribution to his mastery over the chiefs of Kano.  

While the Kutumbawa's reign was characterized by the dispersion of power among State officials, in Babban Zaki's reign, he crippled the influence of his officials to avoid rebellions which became common in the reign of his predecessors. He emphatically crushed two of such rebellions against Birnin Auyau and against Burum Burum.    

He was said to pillage his own chiefs and to coerce them into fight wars using his strategies against their will. He further cut off communication channels between them and ensured communication lines directly led to him through his slaves. In his time, no one was allowed to see him, not even his family, except through his slaves and in times of war, he rarely took to the battlefield himself. He also instituted state sponsored espionage. Amongst his most trusted men, he was able to maintain a balance in their treatment such that each one thought himself to be the Sultan's favorite.

Biography in the Kano Chronicle
Below is a biography of Babba Zaki from Palmer's 1908 English translation of the Kano Chronicle.

References

Monarchs of Kano